Lakin Township may refer to the following townships in the United States:

 Lakin Township, Barton County, Kansas
 Lakin Township, Harvey County, Kansas
 Lakin Township, Kearny County, Kansas
 Lakin Township, Morrison County, Minnesota